The 2013–14 Turkish Cup is the 52nd season of the Turkish Cup. Ziraat Bankası is the sponsor of the tournament, thus the sponsored name is Ziraat Turkish Cup. The winners earn a berth in the play-off round of the 2014–15 UEFA Europa League. Fenerbahçe were the defending champions, but were eliminated in the fourth round. The winners will also qualify for the 2014 Turkish Super Cup.

Round and draw dates

Preliminary round
Teams from the Regional Amateur League competed in this round for a place in the first round. All matches were played on 1 September 2013.

|-

|}

First round
The five winners from the preliminary round, teams from the Regional Amateur League and teams from the 3. Lig competed in this stage to earn a place in the second round. Matches were played on 11 and 12 September 2013.

|-

|}

Second round
The forty winners from the first round, 36 teams from the 2. Lig, 19 teams from the 1. Lig and 13 teams from the Süper Lig competed in this stage to earn a place in the third round. Matches were played between 24 September & 3 October 2013.

|-

|}

Third round
54 teams competed in the third round. Matches were played on the first team's home ground on 29, 30, 31 October and 6 November.

Fourth round
5 teams from Süper Lig, that are playing in European competitions (namely, Galatasaray, Fenerbahçe, Beşiktaş, Trabzonspor, and Bursaspor joined 27 winners from third round. 32 teams competed for the fifth round and a seeding procedure was underway for the draw. Matches were played on the first team's home ground. 16 teams advanced to the fifth round.

Fifth round
16 winners of the fourth round played against each other for the last 8 spots for the group stage.

Group stage
8 winners from the fifth and the last qualifying round were split into two groups of 4 teams. This stage will be a round-robin tournament with home and away matches, in the vein of UEFA European competitions' group stages. The winners and runners-up of the two groups will advance to the semi-finals.

Group A

Group B

Bracket

Semi-finals
Winner of the first group will be drawn against runners-up of the second group. Also the winners of the second group will play against runners-up of the first group. The matches will be contested as two-legged ties with home and away matches. The runners-up will play the first match in their home ground. The winners of the two legs will play in the final.

First leg

Second leg

Final 
The final was contested in Konya as a one-off match. The winners were awarded 50 medals per club along with the Turkish Cup trophy.

References

2013-14
2013–14 domestic association football cups
Cup